Duilio (born Lorenzo Duilio di Cicco, 23 February 1973, Basel) is a Swiss singer, best known for his participation in the 1994 Eurovision Song Contest.

Duilio was chosen by broadcaster SRG SSR to represent Switzerland in the 39th Eurovision Song Contest with the song "Sto pregando" ("I'm Praying").  At the contest, held in Dublin on 30 April, "Sto pregando" could only finish in 20th place of 25 entries, meaning that under the rules in operation at the time, Switzerland would be 'relegated' and would not take part in the 1995 contest, marking their first absence since the Eurovision began in 1956.

Duilio released one album, titled Duilio in 1994 but this did not prove successful.

References 

 

Italian-language singers
Eurovision Song Contest entrants for Switzerland
Swiss-Italian people
Eurovision Song Contest entrants of 1994
Musicians from Basel-Stadt
1973 births
Living people
21st-century Swiss male  singers